Karin Deleurand (born 7 May 1959) is a Danish former breaststroke swimmer. She competed in two events at the 1976 Summer Olympics.

References

External links
 

1959 births
Living people
Danish female breaststroke swimmers
Olympic swimmers of Denmark
Swimmers at the 1976 Summer Olympics
People from Ballerup
Sportspeople from the Capital Region of Denmark